Lacey Wildd (born Paula Ann Simonds on April 23, 1968) is an American reality television personality, model, and B movie actress, who is well known for her extreme body modifications and bust proportion. Wildd rose to some prominence when she was featured on the MTV documentary series True Life.

Surgeries

Breast augmentations
Wildd has spent over $250,000 on breast augmentation surgeries. Originally an A cup, she has since moved to an LLL cup. To achieve this, Wildd has had 12 separate surgeries. As of mid 2014, Wildd is preparing for a surgery to move to a QQQ cup. To avoid harassment, she has not released the name of the doctor that will be performing the surgery. She has reported that she will be traveling to Brazil, a country well known for medical tourism, to complete the surgery.

To support her breast augmentations, Wildd had to have pig skin sewed inside her abdomen. She stated that "it feels like guitar strings." She has also had to have an internal bra surgery to support her breasts and make sure that her skin could support them.

To sleep, Wildd has to lie at a thirty degree angle, or she feels like she "is being suffocated." At their current size, her breasts weigh 42 lbs together.

In 2014, Wildd's story of her breast augmentations was featured on the E! network's Botched reality series.

Other surgeries
Wildd has had 36 plastic surgery operations, stating, "I want to be the adult Barbie, like the extreme Barbie." She has had her buttocks enlarged, eyes made wider, nose made thinner and a myriad of other procedures.

Business
In 2016, Wildd became a professional psychic, using the name Ghostbusty. She stated, "Everything happens for a reason and I know I was supposed to have huge boobs to help the world one soul at a time.... I had near-death experiences as a child and I think that is what caused me to have these abilities. I once refused to get in a car that crashed and killed the passenger and another time I fell down a well. As long as I can remember I’ve tried to hide this side to me but my ex-boyfriend made me realise it was something to be embraced." She does readings from her home in Dania Beach, Florida.

Personal life
Wildd is the mother of six children. Her daughter Tori has appeared on an installment of True Life, an MTV series, titled "I Have A Hot Mom." Tori, who is opposed to the various surgeries her mother has undergone, has stated, "My life revolves around her boobs." Her son Brandon has stated, "Everything's fake, I think. I think she looked pretty before she even had the surgery."

ABC News reported that Wildd was married by age 16 and divorced with two children by age 21. After her divorce, she worked as a waitress, where she changed her hair color from brown to blonde and got her first breast augmentation surgery.

Filmography

Film

Television

References

External links

Living people
1968 births
Actresses from Miami
People from Dania Beach, Florida
21st-century American women